David Guy Compton (born August 19, 1930) is a British author who writes science fiction under the name D. G. Compton. He used the name Guy Compton for his earlier crime novels and the pseudonym Frances Lynch for his Gothic novels. He has also written short stories, radio plays, and a non-fiction book on stammering, its causes and cures.

Compton was born in London. Son of Gerald Cross (Actor), and Nuna Davey (Actress). His first published book was the 1962 crime novel Too Many Murderers. His 1970 novel The Steel Crocodile was nominated for the Nebula Award, and his 1974 novel The Continuous Katherine Mortenhoe was filmed as Death Watch by Bertrand Tavernier in 1979.

The 1983 film Brainstorm was very similar in content to Compton's 1968 novel Synthajoy.

In Science Fiction: History, Science, Vision, Robert Scholes and Eric S. Rabkin write:
Compton's work is informed by an acute and subtle moral sense which avoids the extremes of satire and sentiment while compelling us to see the world ethically...he succeeds superbly in preserving certain traditional fictional values and human values in works of genuine science fiction.

Compton was named the 2007 Author Emeritus by the Science Fiction and Fantasy Writers of America.

Bibliography
As Guy Compton:
 Too Many Murderers (1962)
 Medium for Murder (1963)
 Dead on Cue (1964)
 High Tide for Hanging (1965)
 Disguise for a Dead Gentleman (1966)
 And Murder Came Too (1967)

As D. G. Compton:
 The Quality of Mercy (1965)
 Farewell, Earth's Bliss (1966)
 The Silent Multitude (1967)
 Synthajoy (1968)
 The Palace (1969) (non-SF)
 The Steel Crocodile (1970) Alternate title: The Electric Crocodile
 Chronocules (1971) Alternate titles: Chronicules and Hot Wireless Sets, Aspirin Tablets, the Sandpaper Slides of Used Matchboxes, and Something that Might have been Castor Oil
 The Continuous Katherine Mortenhoe (1974) Alternate titles: The Unsleeping Eye and Death Watch
 The Missionaries (1975)
 A Usual Lunacy (1978)
 Windows (1979)
 Ascendancies (1980)
 Scudder's Game (1988)
 Ragnarok (1991), with John Gribbin
 Nomansland (1993)
 Stammering: its nature, history, causes and cures (1993) (non-fiction)
 Justice City (1994)
 Back of Town Blues (1996)
 Die Herren von Talojz (1997) German translation only

As Frances Lynch:
 Twice Ten Thousand Miles (1974)
 The Fine and Handsome Captain (1975)
 Stranger at the Wedding (1976)
 A Dangerous Magic (1978)
 In the House of Dark Music (1979)

References

External links
 
 https://web.archive.org/web/20080117044155/http://www.sfwa.org/awards/2007/index.html#AuthorEmeritus

1930 births
Living people
Writers from London
English science fiction writers
English male novelists